Jack Oliver (born London, England), was a  entertainment executive and entrepreneur, is best known as the president of the Beatles'  Apple Records label from 1969 to 1971. Oliver got his start in the music industry at Chappell Music Publishing on Bond Street, London. After two years at Chappell, he formed a band with UK songwriter, Gary Osborne called The Chocolate Watch Band.  Not to be confused with the American band with the same name.  The UK band signed with Decca Records and released two singles in the late 60s - "The Sound Of Summer" and "Requiem". Both were well received and became minor hits in the UK.

The Beatles
In 1967, Oliver joined the Beatles Company in the music publishing division at 94 Baker Street, London.  Once Apple Corp. was officially formed in 1968, they moved offices to Savile Row in London, where Oliver worked with famed Apple publicist Derek Taylor.  Oliver also managed recording artist and Paul McCartney's protégé, Mary Hopkin when she was first signed to the newly created Apple Records. Oliver then transferred from music publishing and management to Apple Records where he oversaw the foreign and production departments. Oliver became the president of Apple Records from 1969 – 1971 where he worked closely with the Beatles on their various solo projects, albums and with the artists signed to the record label. This was one of the most active periods in Apple Records.

1970s 
When the Beatles split in 1971, Oliver moved to Los Angeles, California where he partnered with Peter Asher in a music entertainment management company specializing in, production, and tours for acclaimed recording artists such as Linda Ronstadt and James Taylor, who achieved great success with Grammy award-winning, multi-gold and platinum albums and sold out tours in support of - James Taylor, Sweet Baby James, JT, Flag, Heart Like a Wheel, Simple Dreams, Don't Cry Now, Prisoner In Disguise, Living In The USA

1980s
Oliver went on to produce concerts and tours in the United States and abroad for Cat Stevens, James Taylor, Linda Ronstadt, Jackson Browne, Barbra Streisand, Carole King, America, The Motels and The Eagles. In addition, he produced videos and handled product management for Disney Pictures, Jordache Jeans, Virgin Video, Datsun Motors, Dave Mason, Madonna, and Elton John - plus concept development and production of the long-running Las Vegas show, 'SPLASH.'

1994 –2001
Oliver was a personal advisor and chief of staff for Academy-Award-winning actor, Nicolas Cage. Oliver was also involved in the management of Cage’s production companies—Saturn Productions and Saturn Films  working on such film productions as Shadow of the Vampire (2000) and The Life of David Gale (2003).

Current
Oliver is currently writing and producing. He has several projects in active development, including: a documentary celebrating the Beatles company - Apple; a Sixties era romantic comedy script and his first autobiographical novel.

Japanese manga artist Naoki Urasawa met with Oliver and went on to draw two short instalments in his "Musica Nostra" series that depict the meeting and how Oliver started working at Apple Records.

References

Living people
Apple Corps
Apple Records
Year of birth missing (living people)
Businesspeople from London